This is a list of songs recorded by The Pogues, an Anglo-Irish Celtic punk band. Most of the songs were composed by band members, especially lead singer Shane MacGowan, though the band's repertoire also includes renditions of folk songs from around the world, and especially from Ireland.

Songs

References

Pogues
Pogues